James Alexander "Sandy" Green FRS (26 February 1926 – 7 April 2014) was a mathematician and Professor at the Mathematics Institute at the University of Warwick, who worked in the field of representation theory.

Early life
Sandy Green was born in February 1926 in Rochester, New York, but moved to Toronto with his emigrant Scottish parents later that year. The family returned to Britain in May 1935 when his father, Frederick C. Green, took up the Drapers Professorship of French at the University of Cambridge.

Education
Green was educated at the Perse School, Cambridge. He won a scholarship to the University of St Andrews and matriculated aged 16 in 1942. He took an ordinary BSc in 1944, and then, after scientific service in the war, was awarded a BSc Honours in 1947. He gained his PhD at St John's College, Cambridge in 1951, under the supervision of Philip Hall and David Rees.

Career

World War II
In the summer of 1944, he was conscripted for national scientific service at the age of eighteen, and was he was assigned to work at Bletchley Park, where he acted as a human "computer" carrying out calculations in Hut F, the "Newmanry", a department led by Max Newman, which used special-purpose Colossus computers to assist in breaking German naval codes.

Academic work
His first lecturing post (1950) was at the University of Manchester, where Newman was his Head of Department. In 1964 he became a Reader at the University of Sussex, and then in 1965 was appointed as a Professor at the newly formed Mathematics Institute at Warwick University, where he led the algebra group. He spent several periods as a visiting academic in the United States, beginning with a year at the Institute for Advanced Study in Princeton, New Jersey in 1960–61, as well as similar visits to universities in France, Germany and Portugal.  After retiring from Warwick he became a member of the faculty and Professor Emeritus at the Mathematics Institute of the University of Oxford, in whose meetings he participated actively. His final publication was produced at the age of eighty.

Work in mathematics
Green found all the characters of general linear groups over finite fields (Green 1955) and invented the Green correspondence in modular representation theory. Both Green functions in the representation theory of groups of Lie type and Green's relations in the area of semigroups are named after him. His final publication (2007) was a revised and augmented edition of his 1980 work, Polynomial Representations of GL(n).

Personal life
Green met his wife, Margaret Lord, at Bletchley Park, where she worked as a Colossus operator, also in the Newmanry section (Hut F). The couple married in August 1950, and have two daughters and a son.  Up to his death, he lived in Oxford.

Honours
He was elected to the Royal Society of Edinburgh in 1968 and the Royal Society in 1987 and was awarded two London Mathematical Society prizes: the Senior Berwick Prize in 1984 and the de Morgan Medal in 2001.

Bibliography
 (1955)  The characters of the finite general linear group, Trans. A. M. S. 80 402–447.
 (2007) Polynomial Representations of GL_n, Lecture Notes in Mathematics, Springer, Vol. 830. 2nd edition with an Appendix on Schensted Correspondence and Littelmann Paths, K. Erdmann, J. A. Green and M. Shocker

References

External links
 

 Warwick page Profile at Warwick University

1926 births
2014 deaths
Academics of the Victoria University of Manchester
Academics of the University of Sussex
Academics of the University of Warwick
Alumni of St John's College, Cambridge
Alumni of the University of St Andrews
20th-century British mathematicians
21st-century British mathematicians
British science writers
Fellows of the Royal Society
Group theorists
Bletchley Park people
People from Oxford
People educated at The Perse School